Stearns House may refer to:

Stearns House (Denver, Colorado), listed on the National Register of Historic Places (NRHP) in Colorado
Samuel Stearns House, part of the Broad Street Historic District (Middletown, Connecticut)
Stearns–Wadsworth House, Blackberry Township, Illinois, listed on the NRHP
R. H. Stearns Building, Boston, Massachusetts, listed on the NRHP
Amos Stearns House, Waltham, Massachusetts, listed on the NRHP
Dunbar–Stearns House, Waltham, Massachusetts, listed on the NRHP in Massachusetts
Frederick K. Stearns House, Detroit, Michigan, listed on the NRHP
Stearns House, the original building of St. Cloud State University, St. Cloud, Minnesota
Edward R. Stearns House, Wyoming, Ohio, listed on the NRHP
William Stearns House, Wyoming, Ohio, listed on the NRHP
Roome–Stearns House, Portland, Oregon, listed on the NRHP in Oregon